Simon Santoso (born 29 July 1985) is an Indonesian former badminton player. He was two-time Southeast Asian Games men's singles champion winning in 2009 and 2011, also featured in Indonesia team that won the men's team title in 2003, 2007, 2009, and 2011. Santoso won the Indonesia Open a Superseries Premier tournament in 2012. He reached a career high as world number 3 in August 2010.

Career 
When he was young, Santoso joined the Tangkas Jakarta badminton club before joining the Indonesian National team. In 2005, he won the Vietnam Satellite and the silver medal at the 2005 Southeast Asian Games. His best results on the world circuit until recently were runner-up finishes at the 2008 Singapore, 2007 Swiss, and 2008 Indonesia Open. He was eliminated at the semi-finals in the Japan Open Super Series and the Chinese Taipei Open. In September 2008, Santoso won the Chinese Taipei Open after defeating Roslin Hashim from Malaysia in the final round by scores of 21–18, 13–21, 21–10.

In October 2009, he won his first Superseries ever in Denmark Open, after beating Marc Zwiebler of Germany in the final round, 21–14, 21–6. He won gold in the 2009 Southeast Asian Games by defeating Sony Dwi Kuncoro.

In 2011, he retained his gold medal in Southeast Asian Games by beating Tanongsak Saensomboonsuk in 3 sets.

In 2012, he helped Indonesia Garuda to win the inaugural Axiata Cup. In June 2012, he won Indonesia Open Superseries Premier title 21–18, 13–21, 21–11 after defeating Du Pengyu of China in the final.

Personal life 
Born in Tegal, Central Java, Santoso is the youngest of four children of Hosea Liem (father) and Rahel Yanti (mother). His hobbies are swimming and reading comics. He married Evelyn Carmelita on 6 December 2014, and now have two children.

Achievements

Southeast Asian Games 
Men's singles

Asian Junior Championships 

Boys' singles

BWF Superseries (3 titles, 4 runners-up) 
The BWF Superseries, which was launched on 14 December 2006 and implemented in 2007, is a series of elite badminton tournaments, sanctioned by the Badminton World Federation (BWF). BWF Superseries levels are Superseries and Superseries Premier. A season of Superseries consists of twelve tournaments around the world that have been introduced since 2011. Successful players are invited to the Superseries Finals, which are held at the end of each year.

Men's singles

  BWF Superseries Finals tournament
  BWF Superseries Premier tournament
  BWF Superseries tournament

BWF Grand Prix (4 titles, 1 runner-up) 
The BWF Grand Prix had two levels, the BWF Grand Prix and Grand Prix Gold. It was a series of badminton tournaments sanctioned by the Badminton World Federation (BWF) which was held from 2007 to 2017.

Men's singles

  BWF Grand Prix Gold tournament
  BWF Grand Prix tournament

IBF International (1 title, 1 runner-up)
Men's singles

Performance timeline

National team 
 Junior level

 Senior level

Individual competitions 
 Junior level

 Senior level

Participation at Indonesian Team 
 4 times at Sudirman Cup (2005, 2007, 2009, 2011)
 6 times at Thomas Cup (2004, 2006, 2008, 2010, 2012, 2014)

Record against selected opponents 
Includes results against athletes who competed in Super Series finals, World Championships semi-finals, and Olympic quarterfinals.

  Bao Chunlai 0–4
  Chen Hong 0–1
  Chen Jin 1–7
  Chen Long 0–3
  Chen Yu 1–2
  Du Pengyu 3–2
  Lin Dan 1–11
  Tian Houwei 1–1
  Viktor Axelsen 1–0
  Peter Gade 4–11
  Jan Ø. Jørgensen 3–0
  Hans-Kristian Vittinghus 0–2
  Parupalli Kashyap 4–0
  Sony Dwi Kuncoro 1–1
  Taufik Hidayat 5–5
  Tommy Sugiarto 3–0
  Kento Momota 1–1
  Sho Sasaki 6–2
  Lee Hyun-il 1–5
  Park Sung-hwan 1–2
  Shon Seung-mo 1–0
  Son Wan-ho 3–1
  Lee Chong Wei 2–9
  Liew Daren 0–2
  Wong Choong Hann 3–1
  Ronald Susilo 1–1
  Boonsak Ponsana 3–5

References

External links 
 BWF Player Profile

1985 births
Living people
People from Tegal
Sportspeople from Central Java
Indonesian people of Chinese descent
Indonesian male badminton players
Badminton players at the 2012 Summer Olympics
Olympic badminton players of Indonesia
Badminton players at the 2006 Asian Games
Badminton players at the 2010 Asian Games
Asian Games bronze medalists for Indonesia
Asian Games medalists in badminton
Medalists at the 2006 Asian Games
Medalists at the 2010 Asian Games
Competitors at the 2003 Southeast Asian Games
Competitors at the 2005 Southeast Asian Games
Competitors at the 2007 Southeast Asian Games
Competitors at the 2009 Southeast Asian Games
Competitors at the 2011 Southeast Asian Games
Southeast Asian Games gold medalists for Indonesia
Southeast Asian Games silver medalists for Indonesia
Southeast Asian Games medalists in badminton
21st-century Indonesian people
20th-century Indonesian people